Shihabuddin Sharaful-udaba Sabir (Persian: شهاب‌الدین شرف‌الادبا صابر) known as Adib Sabir (ادیب صابر), was a 12th-century Persian poet. Originating from Termedh, he was employed in the court of Sultan Sanjar.

He is said to have also been used by the Sultan as a spy against the Sultan's enemies, who eventually drowned him in the Oxus in 1143 AD.

His Persian poetry writings are fluent and refined in style.

See also

List of Persian poets and authors
Persian literature
Persian poetry

References

Sources
 Jan Rypka, History of Iranian Literature. Reidel Publishing Company. ASIN B-000-6BXVT-K

1143 deaths
12th-century Persian-language poets
12th-century writers
Deaths by drowning
Year of birth unknown
Poets from the Seljuk Empire
Poets of the Khwarazmian Empire